Jarlath Mannion (born 1996) is an Irish hurler who plays for Galway Senior Championship club Cappataggle and at inter-county level with the Galway senior hurling team. He usually lines out at as a forward.

Career

A member of the Cappataggle club, Mannion first came to prominence as a member of the club's 2014 Connacht Club Championship-winning team. He later lined out with the Galway-Mayo Institute of Technology and was man of the match when they won the Ryan Cup in 2019. Mannion first appeared at inter-county level as a member of the Galway minor team during the 2014 All-Ireland Minor Championship. After being omitted from the Galway under-21 team, he made his senior debut as part of Galway's 2019 Walsh Cup-winning team.

Career statistics

Honours

Galway-Mayo Institute of Technology
Ryan Cup: 2019

Cappataggle 
Connacht Intermediate Club Hurling Championship: 2014
Galway Intermediate Hurling Championship: 2014

Galway 
Walsh Cup: 2019

References

1996 births
Living people
Cappataggle hurlers
Galway inter-county hurlers
Quantity surveyors